The Acheron Pulse is a Big Finish Productions audio drama based on the long-running British science fiction television series Doctor Who.

Plot
The Doctor returns to The Drashani Empire, which is now under attack from alien invaders known as The Wrath.

Cast
The Doctor – Colin Baker
Tenebris – James Wilby 
Dukhin – Joseph Kloska  
Teesha – Jane Slavin  
Vincol – Chris Porter  
Boritz – John Banks 
Athrid – Chook Sibtain 
Olerik – Carol Noakes 
Empress Cheni – Kirsty Besterman

Continuity
This is the second in a trilogy of stories that began with the Fifth Doctor in The Burning Prince and concludes with the Seventh Doctor in The Shadow Heart.
Three decades have passed since the Doctor's last visit.

Notes
Chook Sibtain was in the 2009 Tenth Doctor episode The Waters of Mars, as well as The Sarah Jane Adventures story, Warriors of Kudlak.
Jane Slavin was in the 1993 Third Doctor radio play, The Paradise of Death.

References

External links
The Acheron Pulse

2012 audio plays
Sixth Doctor audio plays